Harold Walter Hoehner (January 12, 1935 – February 12, 2009) was an American biblical scholar and was professor of New Testament studies at Dallas Theological Seminary.

Family and education
Hoehner was born in Sangerfield, New York to Walter and Mary (née Siegel) Hoehner, farmers of Swiss and German descent, respectively. He earned his B.A. (1958) from Barrington College, his Th.M. (1962) and Th.D. (1965) from Dallas Theological Seminary, and his Ph.D. (1968) from University of Cambridge; he also did postdoctoral study at University of Tübingen and Cambridge. Hoehner married Virginia (Gini) Bryan on June 7, 1958, with whom he had four children (Stephen, Susan, David, and Deborah).

Career
Hoehner joined the faculty of Dallas Theological Seminary in 1968 as an instructor, becoming an assistant professor there the same year. In 1973 he became associate professor of New Testament, and professor of New Testament and chairman of New Testament and Bible Exposition in 1977. He became distinguished professor of New Testament studies in 1999. He served as director of Ph.D. studies from 1975 until 2002. During his tenure, he had a significant influence on the seminary's approach to teaching biblical exegesis, and became well known for his work on biblical chronology. Hoehner also committed a major portion of his later years as a Bible translator, serving on the translation or review teams for the revision of the New Century Version (1991), the update of the New American Standard Bible (1995), the English Standard Version (2001), the second edition of the New Living Translation (2004), and the first edition of the NET Bible (2005). He was a member of the Society of Biblical Literature, the Evangelical Theological Society, Institute for Biblical Research, the Society for New Testament Studies, and the board of directors for Jews for Jesus.

Publications
Hoehner wrote for several scholarly journals, including more than thirty articles for Bibliotheca Sacra. His doctoral dissertation on Herod Antipas was published by Cambridge University Press (1972), and continues to be a standard work on the subject. His publication Chronological Aspects of the Life of Christ (1978) is often cited in attempts to affix a date to the crucifixion of Jesus, as well as understanding the seventy weeks of Daniel. His "magnum opus", Ephesians: An Exegetical Commentary (2002), called by Craig Blomberg "one of the most prodigious efforts by an individual New Testament scholar in recent times", is noted for its lengthy defense of the epistle's Pauline authorship.

Death and legacy
Hoehner died at the age of 74 in his home in Dallas, Texas after a morning run on February 12, 2009. Among the colleagues and former students contributing to his Festschrift, Interpreting the New Testament Text: Introduction to the Art and Science of Exegesis (2006), were Darrell Bock, Daniel B. Wallace, E. Earle Ellis, I. Howard Marshall, and Edwin M. Yamauchi.

Works

Books

Articles and chapters

References

1935 births
2009 deaths
American evangelicals
American biblical scholars
Barrington College alumni
Dallas Theological Seminary alumni
Dallas Theological Seminary faculty
New Testament scholars
Alumni of the University of Cambridge
People from Oneida County, New York
Translators of the Bible into English
20th-century translators